KTOR (99.7 FM) is a radio station broadcasting a regional Mexican format. Licensed to Gerber, in Tehama County, Northern California, it serves the cities of Red Bluff, Redding, and Chico in Northern California.

The station is currently owned by Independence Rock Media Group, through licensee Independence Rock Media, LLC, and features programming from Cumulus Media Networks.

Programming
The station previously featured local programming during weekday mornings.  Greg Michaels (Greg Heller) hosts Torch Mornings Monday through Friday, in addition to being the station's general manager. Additional programming includes the Psychedelic Supper, Frank's Magic Bus, and the Classic Rock Lunch Box.

External links

TOR
Radio stations established in 1971
Tehama County, California